Anne Wellesley, 7th Duchess of Ciudad Rodrigo (2 February 1910 – 1998), styled as Lady Anne Wellesley from 1910 to 1933 and titled as the 7th Duchess of Ciudad Rodrigo from 1943 to 1949, was a British aristocrat and a socialite.

Life and family
She was the elder child and only daughter of Arthur Wellesley, 5th Duke of Wellington, 5th Duke of Ciudad Rodrigo, and his wife, the Hon. Lilian Maud Glen Coats (elder daughter of George Coats, 1st Baron Glentanar).

During her late teens, she courted (and was rumoured to be the fiancée of) Edward, Prince of Wales. In the winter of 1928, she was suffering from pneumonia whilst the Prince was touring Africa, and he is said to have received coded radio bulletins in regard to her health. Rumours of their engagement were later officially denied by Buckingham Palace.

On 23 March 1933, she married the Hon. David Rhys, younger son of the 7th Baron Dynevor. She was one of a series of society beauties photographed as classical figures by Madame Yevonde. The couple had two children, Llewelyn Arthur (1935–2005) and Elizabeth Maud (1937–2001), before divorcing in 1963.

Her brother, Henry, had inherited their father's titles in 1941. Upon Henry's death in September 1943, she inherited the Spanish Dukedom of Ciudad Rodrigo and the honour of Grandee of Spain (which had been awarded to her ancestor, the 1st Duke, and was able to pass through the female line), whilst the non-Spanish titles passed to her uncle, Lord Gerald Wellesley. She became the 7th Duchess of Ciudad Rodrigo, and her husband was styled as Duke of Ciudad Rodrigo and Grandee of Spain. However, she ceded the dukedom to her uncle in 1949, and two estates in Andalucia, in exchange for a monetary settlement.

Sources

External links 
 Lady Anne Maud Rhys (née Wellesley) at the National Portrait Gallery

1910 births
1998 deaths
Anne Rhys
Daughters of British dukes
107
Spanish duchesses